This is a list of file formats used by computers, organized by type. Filename extension it is usually noted in parentheses if they differ from the file format name or abbreviation. Many operating systems do not limit filenames to one extension shorter than 4 characters, as was common with some operating systems that supported the File Allocation Table (FAT) file system.  Examples of operating systems that do not impose this limit include Unix-like systems, and Microsoft Windows NT, 95-98, and ME which have no three character limit on extensions for 32-bit or 64-bit applications on file systems other than pre-Windows 95 and Windows NT 3.5 versions of the FAT file system. Some filenames are given extensions longer than three characters. While MS-DOS and NT always treat the suffix after the last period in a file's name as its extension, in UNIX-like systems, the final period does not necessarily mean that the text after the last period is the file's extension.

Some file formats, such as .txt or .text, may be listed multiple times.

Archive and compressed 

 .?Q? – files that are compressed, often by the SQ program.
 7z – 7z: 7-Zip compressed file
 A – An external file extension for C/C++
 AAC – Advanced Audio Coding
 ace – ace: ACE compressed file
 ALZ – ALZip compressed file
 APK – Android package: Applications installable on Android; package format of the Alpine Linux distribution 
 APPX – Microsoft Application Package (.appx)
 AT3 – Sony's UMD data compression
 ARC – ARC: pre-Zip data compression
 ARC – Nintendo U8 Archive (mostly Yaz0 compressed)
 ARJ – ARJ compressed file
 ASS, SSA –ASS (also SSA): a subtitles file created by Aegisub, a video typesetting application (also a Halo game engine file)
 B – (B file) Similar to .a, but less compressed.
 BA – BA: Scifer Archive (.ba), Scifer External Archive Type
 BIN – compressed archive, can be read and used by CD-ROMs and Java, extractable by 7-zip and WINRAR
 .bkf – Microsoft backup created by NTBackup.c
 Blend – An external 3D file format used by the animation software, Blender.
 .bz2 – bzip2
 BMP – Bitmap Image – You can create one by right-clicking the home screen, next, click new, then, click Bitmap Image
 cab – A cabinet (.cab) file is a library of compressed files stored as one file. Cabinet files are used to organize installation files that are copied to the user's system.
 c4 – JEDMICS image files, a DOD system
 cals – JEDMICS image files, a DOD system
 xaml – Used in programs like Visual Studio to create exe files.
 CPT, SEA – Compact Pro (Macintosh)
 DAA – DAA: Closed-format, Windows-only compressed disk image
 deb – deb: Debian install package
 DMG – an Apple compressed/encrypted format
 DDZ – a file which can only be used by the "daydreamer engine" created by "fever-dreamer", a program similar to RAGS, it's mainly used to make somewhat short games.
 DN – Adobe Dimension CC file format
 DNG – "Digital Negative" a type of raw image file format used in digital photography.
 DPE – Package of AVE documents made with Aquafadas digital publishing tools.
 .egg – Alzip Egg Edition compressed file
 .egt – EGT Universal Document also used to create compressed cabinet files replaces .ecab
 .ECAB, .ezip – EGT Compressed Folder used in advanced systems to compress entire system folders, replaced by EGT Universal Document
 ESD – ESD: Electronic Software Distribution, a compressed and encrypted WIM File
 .ess – EGT SmartSense File, detects files compressed using the EGT compression system.
 .exe – Windows application
 .flipchart – Used in Promethean ActivInspire Flipchart Software.
 .gbs, .ggp, .gsc – GBS OtterUI binary scene file
 .gho, .ghs – GHO Norton Ghost
 .gif – GIF Graphics Interchange Format
 .gz – gzip Compressed file
 .html – HTML code file
 .ipg – Format in which Apple Inc. packages their iPod games. can be extracted through Winrar
 jar – jar ZIP file with manifest for use with Java applications.
 JPG – Joints Photographic Experts Group – Image File
 JPEG – Joints Photographic Experts Group – Image File
 .Lawrence – LBR Lawrence Compiler Type file
 LBR – LBR Library file
 LQR – LQR LBR Library file compressed by the SQ program.
 .lzh – LHA Lempel, Ziv, Huffman
 .lz – lzip Compressed file
 .lzo – lzo
 lzma – lzma Lempel–Ziv–Markov chain algorithm compressed file
 LZX – LZX
 .lua - Lua
 .mbw – MBRWizard archive
 MHTML – Mime HTML (Hyper-Text Markup Language) code file
 .midi -  Musical Instrument Digital Interface
 .mpq – MPQ Archives Used by Blizzard Entertainment
 .bin – BIN MacBinary 
 .nl2pkg – NoLimits 2 Package
 .nth – NTH: Nokia Theme Used by Nokia Series 40 Cellphones
 .oar – OAR: OAR archive
 OSG – Compressed osu! live gameplay archive (optimized for spectating)
 OSK – Compressed osu! skin archive
 OSR – Compressed osu! replay archive
 OSZ – Compressed osu! beatmap archive
 PAK – Enhanced type of .ARC archive
 .par, .par2 – PAR Parchive
 .paf – PAF Portable Application File
 .pea – PEA PeaZip archive file
 PNG – Portable Network Graphic Image File
 Webp - Raster image format developed by Google for web graphics
 .php – PHP code file
 .pyk – PYK Compressed file
 .pk3 – PK3 Quake 3 archive (See note on Doom³)
 .pk4 – PK4 Doom³ archive (Opens similarly to a zip archive.)
 .pxz – PXZ A compressed layered image file used for the image editing website, pixlr.com .
 py, pyw – Python code file
 .rar – RAR Rar Archive, for multiple file archive (rar to .r01-.r99 to s01 and so on)
 RAG, RAGS – Game file, a game playable in the RAGS game-engine, a free program which both allows people to create games, and play games, games created have the format "RAG game file"
 RaX – Archive file created by RaX
 RBXL – Roblox Studio place file (XML, binary)
 RBXLX – Roblox Studio place file (exclusively XML)
 RBXM – Roblox Studio model file (XML, binary)
 RBXMX – Roblox Studio model file (exclusively XML)
 RPM – Red Hat package/installer for Fedora, RHEL, and similar systems.
 sb – Scratch file
 sb2 – Scratch 2.0 file
 sb3 – Scratch 3.0 file
 SEN – Scifer Archive (.sen) – Scifer Internal Archive Type
 .sitx – SIT StuffIt (Macintosh)
 SIS, SISX – SIS/SISX: Symbian Application Package
 SKB – Google SketchUp backup File
 .sq – SQ: Squish Compressed Archive
 .srt - SubRip Subtitle - file format for closed captioning or subtitles.
 SWM – Splitted WIM File, usually found on OEM Recovery Partition to store preinstalled Windows image, and to make Recovery backup (to USB Drive) easier (due to FAT32 limitations)
 SZS – Nintendo Yaz0 Compressed Archive
 TAR – TAR: group of files, packaged as one file
 Gzip, .tar.gz – (Gzip, .tar.gz): TGZ gzipped tar file
 .tb – TB Tabbery Virtual Desktop Tab file
 .tib – TIB Acronis True Image backup
 UHA – Ultra High Archive Compression
 .uue – UUE unified utility engine – the generic and default format for all things UUe-related.
uf2 microsoft makecode arcade game.
 VIV – Archive format used to compress data for several video games, including Need For Speed: High Stakes.
 VOL – video game data package.
 VSA – Altiris Virtual Software Archive
 WAX – Wavexpress – A ZIP alternative optimized for packages containing video, allowing multiple packaged files to be all-or-none delivered with near-instantaneous unpacking via NTFS file system manipulation.
 .wfp a Wondershare Flimora project file
 WIM – WIM A compressed disk image for installing Windows Vista or higher, Windows Fundamentals for Legacy PC, or restoring a system image made from Backup and Restore (Windows Vista/7)
 XAP – Windows Phone Application Package
 xz – xz compressed files, based on LZMA/LZMA2 algorithm 
 Z – Unix compress file
 zoo – zoo: based on LZW
 zip – zip: popular compression format
 ZIM – ZIM: an open file format that stores wiki content for offline usage

Physical recordable media archiving 
 ISO – Generic format for most optical media, including CD-ROM, DVD-ROM, Blu-ray, HD DVD and UMD.
 NRG – Proprietary optical media archive format used by Nero applications.
 IMG – Raw disk image, for archiving DOS formatted floppy disks, hard drives, and larger optical media.
 ADF – for archiving Amiga floppy disks
 ADZ – The GZip-compressed version of ADF.
 DMS – a disk-archiving system native to the Amiga.
 DSK – For archiving floppy disks from a number of other platforms, including the ZX Spectrum and Amstrad CPC.
 D64 – An archive of a Commodore 64 floppy disk.
 SDI – used for archiving and providing "virtual disk" functionality.
 MDS – Daemon Tools native disc image format used for making images from optical CD-ROM, DVD-ROM, HD DVD or Blu-ray. It comes together with MDF file and can be mounted with DAEMON Tools.
 MDX – Daemon Tools format that allows getting one MDX disc image file instead of two (MDF and MDS).
 DMG – Macintosh disk image files
 CDI – DiscJuggler image file
 CUE – CDRWrite CUE image file
 CIF – Easy CD Creator .cif format
 C2D – Roxio-WinOnCD .c2d format
 DAA – PowerISO .daa format
 B6T – BlindWrite 6 image file
 B5T – BlindWrite 5 image file
 BWT – BlindWrite 4 image file
 FFPPKG – FreeFire Profile Export Package

LemonOS/LemonTabOS/LemonRoid 
 LEMONAPP – LemonOS/LemonTabOS/LemonRoid App (.lem_app)

Other Extensions 
 HTML – Hypertext Markup Language
 Msi – Windows installation file
 Vdhx – Virtual disk created by Hyper-V (Hyper-V runs on windows operating system)

Computer-aided design 
Computer-aided is a prefix for several categories of tools (e.g., design, manufacture, engineering) which assist professionals in their respective fields (e.g., machining, architecture, schematics).

Computer-aided design (CAD) 
Computer-aided design (CAD) software assists engineers, architects and other design professionals in project design.
 3DXML – Dassault Systemes graphic representation
 3MF – Microsoft 3D Manufacturing Format
 ACP – VA Software VA – Virtual Architecture CAD file
 AMF – Additive Manufacturing File Format
 AEC – DataCAD drawing format
 AR – Ashlar-Vellum Argon – 3D Modeling
 ART – ArtCAM model
 ASC – BRL-CAD Geometry File (old ASCII format)
 ASM – Solidedge Assembly, Pro/ENGINEER Assembly
 BIN, BIM – Data Design System DDS-CAD
 BREP – Open CASCADE 3D model (shape)
 C3D – C3D Toolkit File Format
 C3P – Construct3 Files
 CCC – CopyCAD Curves
 CCM – CopyCAD Model
 CCS – CopyCAD Session
 CAD – CadStd
 CATDrawing – CATIA V5 Drawing document
 CATPart – CATIA V5 Part document
 CATProduct – CATIA V5 Assembly document
 CATProcess – CATIA V5 Manufacturing document
 cgr – CATIA V5 graphic representation file
 ckd – KeyCreator CAD Modeling
 ckt – KeyCreator CAD Modeling
 CO – Ashlar-Vellum Cobalt – parametric drafting and 3D modeling
 DRW – Caddie Early version of Caddie drawing – Prior to Caddie changing to DWG
 DFT – Solidedge Draft
 DGN – MicroStation design file
 DGK – Delcam Geometry
 DMT – Delcam Machining Triangles
 DXF – ASCII Drawing Interchange file format, AutoCAD
 DWB – VariCAD drawing file
 DWF – Autodesk's Web Design Format; AutoCAD & Revit can publish to this format; similar in concept to PDF files; Autodesk Design Review is the reader
 DWG – Popular file format for Computer Aided Drafting applications, notably AutoCAD, Open Design Alliance applications, and Autodesk Inventor Drawing files
 EASM – SolidWorks eDrawings assembly file
 EDRW – eDrawings drawing file
 EMB – Wilcom ES Designer Embroidery CAD file
 EPRT – eDrawings part file
 EscPcb – "esCAD pcb" data file by Electro-System (Japan)
 EscSch – "esCAD sch" data file by Electro-System (Japan)
 ESW – AGTEK format
 EXCELLON – Excellon file
 EXP – Drawing Express format
 F3D – Autodesk Fusion 360 archive file
 FCStd – Native file format of FreeCAD CAD/CAM package
 FM – FeatureCAM Part File
 FMZ – FormZ Project file
 G – BRL-CAD Geometry File
 GBR – Gerber file
 GLM – KernelCAD model
 GRB – T-FLEX CAD File
 GRI – AppliCad GRIM-In file in readable text form for importing roof and wall cladding job data generated by business management and accounting systems into the modelling/estimating program
 GRO – AppliCad GRIM-Out file in readable text form for exporting roof and wall cladding data job material and labour costing data, material lists generated by the modelling/estimating program to business management and accounting systems
 IAM – Autodesk Inventor Assembly file
 ICD – IronCAD 2D CAD file
 IDW – Autodesk Inventor Drawing file
 IFC – buildingSMART for sharing AEC and FM data
 IGES – Initial Graphics Exchange Specification
 .dgn, .cel – Intergraph Standard File Formats Intergraph
 IO – Stud.io 3d model
 IPN – Autodesk Inventor Presentation file
 IPT – Autodesk Inventor Part file
 JT – Jupiter Tesselation
 MCD – Monu-CAD (Monument/Headstone Drawing file)
 MDG – Model of Digital Geometric Kernel
 model – CATIA V4 part document
 OCD – Orienteering Computer Aided Design (OCAD) file
 PAR – Solidedge Part
 PIPE – PIPE-FLO Professional Piping system design file
 PLN – ArchiCad project
 PRT – NX (recently known as Unigraphics), Pro/ENGINEER Part, CADKEY Part
 PSM – Solidedge Sheet
 PSMODEL – PowerSHAPE Model
 PWI – PowerINSPECT File
 PYT – Pythagoras File
 SKP – SketchUp Model
 RLF – ArtCAM Relief
 RVM – AVEVA PDMS 3D Review model
 RVT – Autodesk Revit project files
 RFA – Autodesk Revit family files
 RXF – AppliCad annotated 3D roof and wall geometry data in readable text form used to exchange 3D model geometry with other systems such as truss design software
 S12 – Spirit file, by Softtech
 SCAD – OpenSCAD 3D part model
 SCDOC – SpaceClaim 3D Part/Assembly
 SLDASM – SolidWorks Assembly drawing
 SLDDRW – SolidWorks 2D drawing
 SLDPRT – SolidWorks 3D part model
 dotXSI – For Softimage
 STEP – Standard for the Exchange of Product model data
 STL – Stereo Lithographic data format used by various CAD systems and stereo lithographic printing machines.
 STD – Power Vision Plus – Electricity Meter Data (Circutor)
 TCT – TurboCAD drawing template
 TCW – TurboCAD for Windows 2D and 3D drawing
 UNV – I-DEAS I-DEAS (Integrated Design and Engineering Analysis Software)
 VC6 – Ashlar-Vellum Graphite – 2D and 3D drafting
 VLM – Ashlar-Vellum Vellum, Vellum 2D, Vellum Draft, Vellum 3D, DrawingBoard
 VS – Ashlar-Vellum Vellum Solids
 WRL – Similar to STL, but includes color. Used by various CAD systems and 3D printing rapid prototyping machines. Also used for VRML models on the web.
 X_B – Parasolids binary format
 X_T – Parasolids
 XE – Ashlar-Vellum Xenon – for associative 3D modeling
 ZOFZPROJ – ZofzPCB 3D PCB model, containing mesh, netlist and BOM

Electronic design automation (EDA) 
Electronic design automation (EDA), or electronic computer-aided design (ECAD), is specific to the field of electrical engineering.
 BRD – Board file for EAGLE Layout Editor, a commercial PCB design tool
 BSDL – Description language for testing through JTAG
 CDL – Transistor-level netlist format for IC design
 CPF – Power-domain specification in system-on-a-chip (SoC) implementation (see also UPF)
 DEF – Gate-level layout
 DSPF – Detailed Standard Parasitic Format, Analog-level parasitics of interconnections in IC design
 EDIF – Vendor neutral gate-level netlist format
 FSDB – Analog waveform format (see also Waveform viewer)
 GDSII – Format for PCB and layout of integrated circuits
 HEX – ASCII-coded binary format for memory dumps
 LEF – Library Exchange Format, physical abstract of cells for IC design
 LIB – Library modeling (function, timing) format
 MS12 – NI Multisim file
 OASIS – Open Artwork System Interchange Standard
 OpenAccess – Design database format with APIs
 PSF – Cadence proprietary format to store simulation results/waveforms (2GB limit)
 PSFXL – Cadence proprietary format to store simulation results/waveforms
 SDC – Synopsys Design Constraints, format for synthesis constraints
 SDF – Standard for gate-level timings
 SPEF – Standard format for parasitics of interconnections in IC design
 SPI, CIR – SPICE Netlist, device-level netlist and commands for simulation
 SREC, S19 – S-record, ASCII-coded format for memory dumps
 SST2 – Cadence proprietary format to store mixed-signal simulation results/waveforms
 STIL – Standard Test Interface Language, IEEE1450-1999 standard for Test Patterns for IC
 SV – SystemVerilog source file
 S*P – Touchstone/EEsof Scattering parameter data file – multi-port blackbox performance, measurement or simulated 
 TLF – Contains timing and logical information about a collection of cells (circuit elements)
 UPF – Standard for Power-domain specification in SoC implementation
 V – Verilog source file
 VCD – Standard format for digital simulation waveform
 VHD, VHDL – VHDL source file
 WGL – Waveform Generation Language, format for Test Patterns for IC

Test technology 
Files output from Automatic Test Equipment or post-processed from such.
 Standard Test Data Format

Database 
 4DB – 4D database Structure file
 4DD – 4D database Data file
 4DIndy – 4D database Structure Index file
 4DIndx – 4D database Data Index file
 4DR – 4D database Data resource file (in old 4D versions)
 ACCDB – Microsoft Database (Microsoft Office Access 2007 and later)
 ACCDE – Compiled Microsoft Database (Microsoft Office Access 2007 and later)
 ADT – Sybase Advantage Database Server (ADS)
 APR – Lotus Approach data entry & reports
 BOX – Lotus Notes Post Office mail routing database
 CHML – Krasbit Technologies Encrypted database file for 1 click integration between contact management software and the chameleon(tm) line of imaging workflow solutions
 DAF – Digital Anchor data file
 DAT – DOS Basic
 DAT – Intersystems Caché database file
 DB – Paradox
 DB – SQLite
 DBF – db/dbase II,III,IV and V, Clipper, Harbour/xHarbour, Fox/FoxPro, Oracle
 DTA – Sage Sterling database file
 EGT – EGT Universal Document, used to compress sql databases to smaller files, may contain original EGT database style.
 ESS – EGT SmartSense is a database of files and its compression style. Specific to EGT SmartSense
 EAP – Enterprise Architect Project
 FDB – Firebird Databases
 FDB – Navision database file
 FP, FP3, FP5, FP7 – FileMaker Pro
 FRM – MySQL table definition
 GDB – Borland InterBase Databases
 GTABLE – Google Drive Fusion Table
 KEXI – Kexi database file (SQLite-based)
 KEXIC – shortcut to a database connection for a Kexi databases on a server
 KEXIS – shortcut to a Kexi database
 LDB – Temporary database file, only existing when database is open
 LIRS – Layered Intager Storage. Stores intageres with characters such as semicolons to create lists of data. 
 MDA – Add-in file for Microsoft Access
 MDB – Microsoft Access database
 ADP – Microsoft Access project (used for accessing databases on a server)
 MDE – Compiled Microsoft Database (Access)
 MDF – Microsoft SQL Server Database
 MYD – MySQL MyISAM table data
 MYI – MySQL MyISAM table index
 NCF – Lotus Notes configuration file
 NSF – Lotus Notes database
 NTF – Lotus Notes database design template
 NV2 – QW Page NewViews object oriented accounting database
 ODB – LibreOffice Base or OpenOffice Base database
 ORA – Oracle tablespace files sometimes get this extension (also used for configuration files)
 PCONTACT – WinIM Contact file
 PDB – Palm OS Database
 PDI – Portable Database Image
 PDX – Corel Paradox database management
 PRC – Palm OS resource database
 SQL – bundled SQL queries
 REC – GNU recutils database
 REL – Sage Retrieve 4GL data file
 RIN – Sage Retrieve 4GL index file
 SDB – StarOffice's StarBase
 SDF – SQL Compact Database file
 sqlite – SQLite
 UDL – Universal Data Link
 waData – Wakanda (software) database Data file
 waIndx – Wakanda (software) database Index file
 waModel – Wakanda (software) database Model file
 waJournal – Wakanda (software) database Journal file
 WDB – Microsoft Works Database
 WMDB – Windows Media Database file – The CurrentDatabase_360.wmdb file can contain file name, file properties, music, video, photo and playlist information.

Big Data (Distributed) 
 Avro – Data format appropriate for ingestion of record based attributes.  Distinguishing characteristic is schema is stored on each row enabling schema evolution.
 Parquet – Columnar data storage.  It is typically used within the Hadoop ecosystem.
 ORC – Similar to Parquet, but has better data compression and schema evolution handling.

Desktop publishing 
 AI – Adobe Illustrator
 AVE, ZAVE – Aquafadas
 CDR – CorelDRAW
 CHP, pub, STY, CAP, CIF, VGR, FRM – Ventura Publisher – Xerox (DOS / GEM)
 CPT – Corel Photo-Paint
 DTP – Greenstreet Publisher, GST PressWorks
 FM – Adobe FrameMaker
 GDRAW – Google Drive Drawing
 ILDOC – Broadvision Quicksilver document
 INDD – Adobe InDesign
 MCF – FotoInsight Designer
 PDF – Adobe Acrobat or Adobe Reader
 PMD – Adobe PageMaker
 PPP – Serif PagePlus
 PSD – Adobe Photoshop
 PUB – Microsoft Publisher
 QXD – QuarkXPress
 SLA, SCD – Scribus
 XCF – XCF: File format used by the GIMP, as well as other programs

Document 
These files store formatted text and plain text.

 0   – Plain Text Document, normally used for licensing
 1ST – Plain Text Document, normally preceded by the words "README" (README.1ST)
 600 – Plain Text Document, used in UNZIP history log
 602 – Text602 (T602) document
 ABW – AbiWord document
 ACL – MS Word AutoCorrect List
 AFP – Advanced Function Presentation
 AMI – Lotus Ami Pro Amigaguide
 ANS – American National Standards Institute (ANSI) text
 ASC – ASCII text
 AWW – Ability Write
 CCF – Color Chat 1.0
 CSV – ASCII text as comma-separated values, used in spreadsheets and database management systems
 CWK – ClarisWorks-AppleWorks document
 DBK – DocBook XML sub-format
 DITA – Darwin Information Typing Architecture document
 DOC – Microsoft Word document
 DOCM – Microsoft Word macro-enabled document
 DOCX – Office Open XML document
 DOT – Microsoft Word document template
 DOTX – Office Open XML text document template
 DWD – DavkaWriter Heb/Eng word processor file 
 EGT – EGT Universal Document
 EPUB – EPUB open standard for e-books
 EZW – Reagency Systems easyOFFER document
 FDX – Final Draft
 FTM – Fielded Text Meta
 FTX – Fielded Text (Declared)
 GDOC – Google Drive Document
 HTML – HyperText Markup Language (.html, .htm)
 HWP – Haansoft (Hancom) Hangul Word Processor document
 HWPML – Haansoft (Hancom) Hangul Word Processor Markup Language document
 LOG – Text log file
 LWP – Lotus Word Pro
 MBP – metadata for Mobipocket documents
 MD – Markdown text document
 ME – Plain text document normally preceded by the word "READ" (READ.ME)
 MCW – Microsoft Word for Macintosh (versions 4.0–5.1)
 Mobi – Mobipocket documents
 NB – Mathematica Notebook
 nb – Nota Bene Document (Academic Writing Software)
 NBP – Mathematica Player Notebook
 NEIS – 학교생활기록부 작성 프로그램 (Student Record Writing Program) Document
 NT – N-Triples RDF container (.nt)
 NQ – N-Quads RDF container (.nq)
 ODM – OpenDocument master document
 ODOC – Synology Drive Office Document
 ODT – OpenDocument text document
 OSHEET – Synology Drive Office Spreadsheet
 OTT – OpenDocument text document template
 OMM – OmmWriter text document
 PAGES – Apple Pages document
 PAP – Papyrus word processor document
 PER - Canadian Forces Personnel Appraisal System (CFPAS) Personnel Evaluation Report (PER)
 PDR - Canadian Forces Personnel Appraisal System (CFPAS) Personnel Development Report (PDR)
 PDAX – Portable Document Archive (PDA) document index file
 PDF – Portable Document Format
 QUOX – Question Object File Format for Quobject Designer or Quobject Explorer
 Radix-64 – Need helps!!!
 RTF – Rich Text document
 RPT – Crystal Reports
 SDW – StarWriter text document, used in earlier versions of StarOffice
 SE – Shuttle Document
 STW – OpenOffice.org XML (obsolete) text document template
 Sxw – OpenOffice.org XML (obsolete) text document
 TeX – TeX
 INFO – Texinfo
 Troff – Unix OS document processing system 
 TXT – ASCII or Unicode plain text file
 UOF – Uniform Office Format
 UOML – Unique Object Markup Language
 VIA – Revoware VIA Document Project File
 WPD – WordPerfect document
 WPS – Microsoft Works document
 WPT – Microsoft Works document template
 WRD – WordIt! document
 WRF – ThinkFree Write
 WRI – Microsoft Write document
 xhtml, xht – XHTML eXtensible HyperText Markup Language
 XML – eXtensible Markup Language
 XPS – XPS: Open XML Paper Specification

Financial records 
 MYO – MYOB Limited (Windows) File
 MYOB – MYOB Limited (Mac) File
 TAX – TurboTax File
 YNAB – You Need a Budget (YNAB) File

Financial data transfer formats 
 IFX – Interactive Financial Exchange XML-based specification for various forms of financial transactions
 .ofx – Open Financial Exchange， open standard supported by CheckFree and Microsoft and partly by Intuit; SGML and later XML based
 QFX – proprietary pay-only format used only by Intuit
 .qif – Quicken Interchange Format open standard formerly supported by Intuit

Font file 
 ABF – Adobe Binary Screen Font
 AFM – Adobe Font Metrics
 BDF – Bitmap Distribution Format
 BMF – ByteMap Font Format
 BRFNT – Binary Revolution Font Format
 FNT – Bitmapped Font – Graphics Environment Manager (GEM)
 FON – Bitmapped Font – Microsoft Windows
 MGF – MicroGrafx Font
 OTF – OpenType Font
 PCF – Portable Compiled Format
 PFA – Printer Font ASCII
 PFB – Printer Font Binary – Adobe
 PFM – Printer Font Metrics – Adobe
 AFM – Adobe Font Metrics
 FOND – Font Description resource – Mac OS
 SFD – FontForge spline font database Font
 SNF – Server Normal Format
 TDF – TheDraw Font
 TFM – TeX font metric
 .ttf, .ttc – TrueType Font
 UFO – Unified Font Object is a cross-platform, cross-application, human readable, future proof format for storing font data.
 WOFF – Web Open Font Format

General purpose 
These file formats allow for the rapid creation of new binary file formats.

 IFDS - Incredibly Flexible Data Storage file format. File extension and the magic number does not have to be IFDS.

Geographic information system 

 ASC – ASCII point of interest (POI) text file
 APR – ESRI ArcView 3.3 and earlier project file
 DEM – USGS DEM file format
 E00 – ARC/INFO interchange file format
 GeoJSON –Geographically located data in object notation
 GeoTIFF – Geographically located raster data
 GML – Geography Markup Language file
 GPX – XML-based interchange format
 ITN – TomTom Itinerary format
 MXD – ESRI ArcGIS project file, 8.0 and higher
 NTF – National Transfer Format file
 OV2 – TomTom POI overlay file
 SHP – ESRI shapefile
 TAB – MapInfo Table file format
 GeoTIFF – Geographically located raster data: text file giving corner coordinate, raster cells per unit, and rotation
 DTED – Digital Terrain Elevation Data
 KML – Keyhole Markup Language, XML-based

Graphical information organizers 
 3DT – 3D Topicscape, the database in which the meta-data of a 3D Topicscape is held, it is a form of 3D concept map (like a 3D mind-map) used to organize ideas, information, and computer files
 ATY – 3D Topicscape file, produced when an association type is exported; used to permit round-trip (export Topicscape, change files and folders as desired, re-import to 3D Topicscape)
 CAG – Linear Reference System
 FES – 3D Topicscape file, produced when a fileless occurrence in 3D Topicscape is exported to Windows. Used to permit round-trip (export Topicscape, change files and folders as desired, re-import them to 3D Topicscape)
 MGMF – MindGenius Mind Mapping Software file format
 MM – FreeMind mind map file (XML)
 MMP – Mind Manager mind map file
 TPC – 3D Topicscape file, produced when an inter-Topicscape topic link file is exported to Windows; used to permit round-trip (export Topicscape, change files and folders as desired, re-import to 3D Topicscape)

Graphics

Color palettes 
 ACT – Adobe Color Table. Contains a raw color palette and consists of 256 24-bit RGB colour values.
 ASE – Adobe Swatch Exchange. Used by Adobe Photoshop, Illustrator, and InDesign.
 GPL – GIMP palette file. Uses a text representation of color names and RGB values. Various open source graphical editors can read this format, including GIMP, Inkscape, Krita, KolourPaint, Scribus, CinePaint, and MyPaint.
 PAL – Microsoft RIFF palette file

Color management 
 ICC, ICM – Color profile conforming the specification of the ICC.

Raster graphics 
Raster or bitmap files store images as a group of pixels.

 ART – America Online proprietary format
 BLP – Blizzard Entertainment proprietary texture format
 BMP – Microsoft Windows Bitmap formatted image
 BTI – Nintendo proprietary texture format
 CD5 – Chasys Draw IES image
 CIT – Intergraph is a monochrome bitmap format
 CPT – Corel PHOTO-PAINT image
 CR2 – Canon camera raw format; photos have this on some Canon cameras if the quality RAW is selected in camera settings
 CLIP – CLIP STUDIO PAINT format
 CPL – Windows control panel file
 DDS – DirectX texture file
 DIB – Device-Independent Bitmap graphic
 DjVu – DjVu for scanned documents
 EGT – EGT Universal Document, used in EGT SmartSense to compress PNG files to yet a smaller file
 Exif – Exchangeable image file format (Exif) is a specification for the image format used by digital cameras
 GIF – CompuServe's Graphics Interchange Format
 GRF – Zebra Technologies proprietary format
 ICNS – format for icons in macOS. Contains bitmap images at multiple resolutions and bitdepths with alpha channel.
 ICO – a format used for icons in Microsoft Windows. Contains small bitmap images at multiple resolutions and bitdepths with 1-bit transparency or alpha channel.
 .iff, .ilbm, .lbm – IFF ILBM
 JNG – a single-frame MNG using JPEG compression and possibly an alpha channel
 JPEG, JFIF, .jpg, .jpeg – Joint Photographic Experts Group; a lossy image format widely used to display photographic images
 JP2 – JPEG2000
 JPS – JPEG Stereo
 KRA – Krita image file
 LBM – Deluxe Paint image file
 MAX – ScanSoft PaperPort document
 MIFF – ImageMagick's native file format
 MNG – Multiple-image Network Graphics, the animated version of PNG
 MSP – a format used by old versions of Microsoft Paint; replaced by BMP in Microsoft Windows 3.0
 NITF – A U.S. Government standard commonly used in Intelligence systems
 OTB – Over The Air bitmap, a specification designed by Nokia for black and white images for mobile phones
 PBM – Portable bitmap
 PC1 – Low resolution, compressed Degas picture file
 PC2 – Medium resolution, compressed Degas picture file
 PC3 – High resolution, compressed Degas picture file
 PCF – Pixel Coordination Format
 PCX – a lossless format used by ZSoft's PC Paint, popular for a time on DOS systems.
 PDN – Paint.NET image file
 PGM – Portable graymap
 PI1 – Low resolution, uncompressed Degas picture file
 PI2 – Medium resolution, uncompressed Degas picture file; also Portrait Innovations encrypted image format
 PI3 – High resolution, uncompressed Degas picture file
 PICT, PCT – Apple Macintosh PICT image
 PNG – Portable Network Graphic (lossless, recommended for display and edition of graphic images)
 PNM – Portable anymap graphic bitmap image
 PNS – PNG Stereo
 PPM – Portable Pixmap (Pixel Map) image
 .procreate - Procreate (software)’s drawing file
 PSB – Adobe Photoshop Big image file (for large files)
 PSD, PDD – Adobe Photoshop Drawing
 PSP – Paint Shop Pro image
 PX – Pixel image editor image file
 PXM – Pixelmator image file
 PXR – Pixar Image Computer image file
 QFX – QuickLink Fax image
 RAW – General term for minimally processed image data (acquired by a digital camera)
 RLE – a run-length encoding image
 SCT – Scitex Continuous Tone image file
 SGI, RGB, INT, BW – Silicon Graphics Image
 TGA, .tga, .targa, .icb, .vda, .vst, .pix – Truevision TGA (Targa) image
 TIFF, .tif, .tiff – Tagged Image File Format (usually lossless, but many variants exist, including lossy ones)
 TIFF, EP, .tif, .tiff – Tag Image File Format / Electronic Photography, ISO 12234-2; tends to be used as a basis for other formats rather than in its own right.
 VTF – Valve Texture Format
 XBM – X Window System Bitmap
 XCF – GIMP image (from Gimp's origin at the eXperimental Computing Facility of the University of California)
 XPM – X Window System Pixmap
 ZIF – Zoomable/Zoomify Image Format (a web-friendly, TIFF-based, zoomable image format)

Vector graphics 
Vector graphics use geometric primitives such as points, lines, curves, and polygons to represent images.
 3DS - 3D vector graphic file read by the Nintendo 3DS
 3DV – 3-D wireframe graphics by Oscar Garcia
 AMF – Additive Manufacturing File Format
 AWG – Ability Draw
 AI – Adobe Illustrator Document
 CGM – Computer Graphics Metafile, an ISO Standard
 CDR – CorelDRAW Document
 CMX – CorelDRAW vector image
 DP – Drawing Program file for PERQ
 DRAWIO – Diagrams.net offline diagram
 DXF – ASCII Drawing Interchange file Format, used in AutoCAD and other CAD-programs
 E2D – 2-dimensional vector graphics used by the editor which is included in JFire
 EGT – EGT Universal Document, EGT Vector Draw images are used to draw vector to a website
 EPS – Encapsulated Postscript
 FS – FlexiPro file
 GBR – Gerber file
 ODG – OpenDocument Drawing
 MOVIE.BYU – 3D Vector file for polygons, coordinates and more complex shapes
 RenderMan – Displays Shading in both 2D and 3D scapes
 SVG – Scalable Vector Graphics, employs XML
 3DMLW – Scene description languages (3D vector image formats)
 STL – STL: Stereo Lithographic data format (see STL (file format)) used by various CAD systems and stereo lithographic printing machines. See above.
 .wrl – Virtual Reality Modeling Language, VRML Uses this extension for the creation of 3D viewable web images.
 X3D – XML based file for communicating 3D graphics
 SXD – OpenOffice.org XML (obsolete) Drawing
 TGAX – Texture format used by Zwift
 V2D – voucher design used by the voucher management included in JFire
 VDOC – Vector format used in AnyCut, CutStorm, DrawCut, DragonCut, FutureDRAW, MasterCut, SignMaster, VinylMaster software by Future Corporation
 VSD – Vector format used by Microsoft Visio
 VSDX – Vector format used by MS Visio and opened by VSDX Annotator
 VND – Vision numeric Drawing file used in TypeEdit, Gravostyle.
 WMF – WMF: Windows Meta File
 EMF – EMF: Enhanced (Windows) MetaFile, an extension to WMF
 ART – Xara–Drawing (superseded by XAR)
 XAR – Xara–Drawing

3D graphics 

3D graphics are 3D models that allow building models in real-time or non-real-time 3D rendering.
 3DMF – QuickDraw 3D Metafile (.3dmf)
 3DM – OpenNURBS Initiative 3D Model (used by Rhinoceros 3D) (.3dm)
 3MF – Microsoft 3D Manufacturing Format (.3mf)
 3DS – legacy 3D Studio Model (.3ds)
 ABC – Alembic (computer graphics)
 AC – AC3D Model (.ac)
 AMF – Additive Manufacturing File Format
 AN8 – Anim8or Model (.an8)
 AOI – Art of Illusion Model (.aoi)
 ASM – PTC Creo assembly (.asm)
 B3D – Blitz3D Model (.b3d)
 BLEND – Blender (.blend)
 BLOCK – Blender encrypted blend files (.block)
 BMD3 – Nintendo GameCube first-party J3D proprietary model format (.bmd)
 BDL4 – Nintendo GameCube and Wii first-party J3D proprietary model format (2002, 2006–2010) (.bdl)
 BRRES – Nintendo Wii first-party proprietary model format 2010+ (.brres)
 BFRES – Nintendo Wii U and later Switch first-party proprietary model format
 C4D – Cinema 4D (.c4d)
 Cal3D – Cal3D (.cal3d)
 CCP4 – X-ray crystallography voxels (electron density)
 CFL – Compressed File Library (.cfl)
 COB – Caligari Object (.cob)
 CORE3D – Coreona 3D Coreona 3D Virtual File(.core3d)
 CTM – OpenCTM (.ctm)
 DAE – COLLADA (.dae)
 DFF – RenderWare binary stream, commonly used by Grand Theft Auto III-era games as well as other RenderWare titles
 DPM – deepMesh (.dpm)
 DTS – Torque Game Engine (.dts)
 EGG – Panda3D Engine
 FACT – Electric Image (.fac)
 FBX – Autodesk FBX (.fbx)
 G – BRL-CAD geometry (.g)
 GLB – a binary form of glTF required to be loaded in Facebook 3D Posts. (.glb)
 GLM – Ghoul Mesh (.glm)
 glTF – the JSON-based standard developed by Khronos Group (.gltf)
 .hec – Hector Game Engine – Flatspace model format
 IO – Bricklink Stud.io 2.0 Model File (.io)
 IOB – Imagine (3D modeling software) (.iob)
 JAS – Cheetah 3D file (.jas)
 JMESH – Universal mesh data exchange file based on JMesh specification (.jmsh for text/JSON based, .bmsh for binary/UBJSON based)
 LDR – LDraw Model File (.ldr)
 LWO – Lightwave Object (.lwo)
 LWS – Lightwave Scene (.lws)
 LXF – LEGO Digital Designer Model file (.lxf)
 LXO – Luxology Modo (software) file (.lxo)
 M3D – Model3D, universal, engine-neutral format (.m3d)
 MA – Autodesk Maya ASCII File (.ma)
 MAX – Autodesk 3D Studio Max file (.max)
 MB – Autodesk Maya Binary File (.mb)
 MPD – LDraw Multi-Part Document Model File (.mpd)
 MD2 – MD2: Quake 2 model format (.md2)
 MD3 – MD3: Quake 3 model format (.md3)
 MD5 – MD5: Doom 3 model format (.md5)
 MDX – Blizzard Entertainment's own model format (.mdx)
 MESH – New York University(.m)
 MESH – Meshwork Model (.mesh)
 MIOBJECT – Mine-Imator object file (.miobject)
 MIPARTICLE – Mine-Imator particle file (.miparticle)
 MIMODEL – Mine-Imator model file (.mimodel)
 MM3D – Misfit Model 3d (.mm3d)
 MPO – Multi-Picture Object – This JPEG standard is used for 3d images, as with the Nintendo 3DS
 MRC – MRC: voxels in cryo-electron microscopy
 NIF – Gamebryo NetImmerse File (.nif)
 OBJ – Wavefront .obj file (.obj)
 OFF – OFF Object file format (.off)
 OGEX – Open Game Engine Exchange (OpenGEX) format (.ogex)
 PLY – PLY: Polygon File Format / Stanford Triangle Format (.ply)
 PRC – Adobe PRC (embedded in PDF files)
 PRT – PTC Creo part (.prt)
 POV – POV-Ray document (.pov)
 R3D – Realsoft 3D (Real-3D) (.r3d)
 RWX – RenderWare Object (.rwx)
 SIA – Nevercenter Silo Object (.sia)
 SIB – Nevercenter Silo Object (.sib)
 SKP – Google Sketchup file (.skp)
 SLDASM – SolidWorks Assembly Document (.sldasm)
 SLDPRT – SolidWorks Part Document (.sldprt)
 SMD – Valve Studiomdl Data format (.smd)
 U3D – Universal 3D format (.u3d)
 USD – Universal Scene Description (.usd)
 USDA – Universal Scene Description , Human-readable text format (.usda)
 USDC – Universal Scene Description , Binary format (.usdc)
 USDZ – Universal Scene Description Zip  (.usdz)
 VIM – Revizto visual information model format (.vimproj)
 VRML97 – VRML Virtual reality modeling language (.wrl)
 VUE – Vue scene file (.vue)
 VWX – Vectorworks (.vwx)
 WINGS – Wings3D (.wings)
 W3D – Westwood 3D Model (.w3d)
 X – DirectX 3D Model (.x)
 X3D – Extensible 3D (.x3d)
 Z3D – Zmodeler (.z3d)
 ZBMX – Mecabricks Blender Add-On (.zbmx)

Links and shortcuts 
 Alias – Alias (Mac OS)
 JNLP – Java Network Launching Protocol, an XML file used by Java Web Start for starting Java applets over the Internet
 LNK – binary-format file shortcut in Microsoft Windows 95 and later
 APPREF-MS – File shortcut format used by ClickOnce
 NAL – ZENworks Instant shortcut (opens a .EXE not on the C:/ )
 URL – INI file pointing to a URL bookmarks/Internet shortcut in Microsoft Windows
 WEBLOC – Property list file pointing to a URL bookmarks/Internet shortcut in macOS
 SYM – Symbolic link 
 .desktop – Desktop entry on Linux Desktop environments

Mathematical 
 Harwell-Boeing – a file format designed to store sparse matrices
 MML – MathML – Mathematical Markup Language
 ODF – OpenDocument Math Formula
 SXM – OpenOffice.org XML (obsolete) Math Formula

Object code, executable files, shared and dynamically linked libraries 
 8BF – files plugins for some photo editing programs including Adobe Photoshop, Paint Shop Pro, GIMP and Helicon Filter.
 .a - a static library on on Unix-like systems
 .a – Objective C native static library
 a.out – (no suffix for executable image, .o for object files, .so for shared object files) classic UNIX object format, now often superseded by ELF
 APK – Android Application Package
 APP – A folder found on macOS systems containing program code and resources, appearing as one file.
 BAC – an executable image for the RSTS/E system, created using the BASIC-PLUS COMPILE command
 BPL – a Win32 PE file created with Borland Delphi or C++Builder containing a package.
 Bundle – a Macintosh plugin created with Xcode or make which holds executable code, data files, and folders for that code.
 .class – Compiled Java bytecode
 COFF – (no suffix for executable image, .o for object files) UNIX Common Object File Format, now often superseded by ELF
 COM – Simple executable format used by CP/M and DOS.
 DCU – Delphi compiled unit
 DLL – Dynamic library used in Windows and OS/2 to store data, resources and code.
 DOL – the format used by the GameCube and Wii, short for Dolphin, which was the codename of the GameCube.
 .EAR – archives of Java enterprise applications
 ELF – (no suffix for executable image, .o for object files, .so for shared object files) used in many modern Unix and Unix-like systems, including Solaris, other System V Release 4 derivatives, Linux, and BSD)
 .exe – DOS executable (.exe: used in DOS)
 .EXE – New Executable (used in multitasking ("European") MS-DOS 4.0, 16-bit Microsoft Windows, and OS/2)
 .EXE – Portable Executable used in Microsoft Windows and some other systems
 .ipa, .IPA – file extension for apple IOS application executable file. Another form of zip file.
 .JAR – archives of Java class files
 JEFF – a file format allowing execution directly from static memory
 .ko - Loadable kernel module
 LIB - a static library on Microsoft platforms
 LIST – variable list
 Mach-O – (no suffix for executable image, .o for object files, .dylib and .bundle for shared object files) Mach-based systems, notably native format of macOS, iOS, watchOS, and tvOS
 .NLM – NetWare Loadable Module the native 32-bit binaries compiled for Novell's NetWare Operating System (versions 3 and newer)
 .o – un-linked object files directly from the compiler
 OBJ - object file on Windows
 RLL – used in Microsoft operating systems together with a DLL file to store program resources
 .s1es – Executable used for S1ES learning system.
 .so – shared library, typically ELF
 .VAP – Value Added Process the native 16-bit binaries compiled for Novell's NetWare Operating System (version 2, NetWare 286, Advanced NetWare, etc.)
 WAR, .WAR – .WAR are archives of Java Web applications
 .XAP – Windows Phone package
 XBE – XBE is Xbox executable
 XCOFF – (no suffix for executable image, .o for object files, .a for shared object files) extended COFF, used in AIX
 XEX – XEX is Xbox 360 executable
 .XPI – PKZIP archive that can be run by Mozilla web browsers to install software.
Object extensions:
 .OCX – .OCX are Object Control extensions
 .TLB – .TLB are Windows Type Library
 .VBX – .VBX are Visual Basic extensions

Page description language 

 DVI – DVI are Device independent format
 .egt – Universal Document can be used to store CSS type styles 
 PLD – PLD (Need to be added!!!) 
 PCL – PCL (Need to be added!!!) 
 PDF – PDF are Portable Document Format
 .ps, .ps, .gz – PostScript (Need to be added!!!)
 SNP – SNP are Microsoft Access Report Snapshot
 XPS – XPS
 XSL-FO – XSL-FO (Formatting Objects)
 Configurations, Metadata
 CSS – CSS are Cascading Style Sheets
 .xslt, .xsl – XML Style Sheet
 .tpl – Web template

Personal information manager 

 MNB - MyInfo notebook
 MSG – Microsoft Outlook task manager
 ORG – Lotus Organizer PIM package
 ORG – Emacs Org-Mode Mindmanager, contacts, calendar, email-integration
 PST, OST – Microsoft Outlook email communication
 SC2 – Microsoft Schedule+ calendar

Presentation 
 GSLIDES – Google Drive Presentation
 KEY, KEYNOTE – Apple Keynote Presentation
 NB – Mathematica Slideshow
 NBP – Mathematica Player slideshow
 ODP – OpenDocument Presentation
 OTP – OpenDocument Presentation template
 PEZ – Prezi Desktop Presentation
 POT – Microsoft PowerPoint template
 PPS – Microsoft PowerPoint Show
 PPT – Microsoft PowerPoint Presentation
 PPTX – Office Open XML Presentation
 PRZ – Lotus Freelance Graphics
 SDD – StarOffice's StarImpress
 SHF – ThinkFree Show
 SHOW – Haansoft(Hancom) Presentation software document
 SHW – Corel Presentations slide show creation
 SLP – Logix-4D Manager Show Control Project
 SSPSS – SongShow Plus Slide Show
 STI – OpenOffice.org XML (obsolete) Presentation template
 SXI – OpenOffice.org XML (obsolete) Presentation
 THMX – Microsoft PowerPoint theme template
 WATCH – Dataton Watchout Presentation

Project management software 

 MPP – Microsoft Project

Reference management software 

Formats of files used for bibliographic information (citation) management.
 bib – BibTeX
 enl – EndNote
 ris – Research Information Systems RIS (file format)

Scientific data (data exchange) 
 .fits – FITS (Flexible Image Transport System) standard data format for astronomy
 Silo – Silo, a storage format for visualization developed at Lawrence Livermore National Laboratory
 SPC – SPC, spectroscopic data
 EAS3 – binary format for structured data
 EOSSA – Electro-Optic Space Situational Awareness format
 OST – (Open Spatio-Temporal) extensible, mainly images with related data, or just pure data; meant as an open alternative for microscope images
 CCP4 – CCP4, X-ray crystallography voxels (electron density)
 MRC – MRC, voxels in cryo-electron microscopy
 HITRAN – spectroscopic data with one optical/infrared transition per line in the ASCII file (.hit)
 .root – hierarchical platform-independent compressed binary format used by ROOT
 SDF – Simple Data Format (SDF), a platform-independent, precision-preserving binary data I/O format capable of handling large, multi-dimensional arrays.
 MYD – Everfine LEDSpec software file for LED measurements
 CSDM – (Core Scientific Dataset Model) model for multi-dimensional and correlated datasets from various spectroscopies, diffraction, microscopy, and imaging techniques (.csdf, .csdfe).

Multi-domain 
 NetCDF – Network common data format
 HDR, HDF, h4, h5 – Hierarchical Data Format
 SDXF – SDXF, (Structured Data Exchange Format)
 CDF – Common Data Format
 CGNS – CGNS, CFD General Notation System
 FMF – Full-Metadata Format

Meteorology 
 GRIB – Grid in Binary, WMO format for weather model data
 BUFR – WMO format for weather observation data
 PP – UK Met Office format for weather model data
 NASA-Ames – Simple text format for observation data. First used in aircraft studies of the atmosphere.

Chemistry 

 CML – Chemical Markup Language (CML) (.cml)
 .mol, .sd, .sdf – Chemical table file (CTab)
 .dx, .jdx – Joint Committee on Atomic and Molecular Physical Data (JCAMP)
 .smi – Simplified molecular input line entry specification (SMILES)

Mathematics 
 .g6, .s6 – graph6, sparse6, ASCII encoding of Adjacency matrices

Biology 
Molecular biology and bioinformatics:
AB1 – In DNA sequencing, chromatogram files used by instruments from Applied Biosystems
ACE – A sequence assembly format
ASN.1 – Abstract Syntax Notation One, is an International Standards Organization (ISO) data representation format used to achieve interoperability between platforms. NCBI uses ASN.1 for the storage and retrieval of data such as nucleotide and protein sequences, structures, genomes, and PubMed records.
BAM – Binary Alignment/Map format (compressed SAM format)
BCF – Binary compressed VCF format
BED – The browser extensible display format is used for describing genes and other features of DNA sequences
CAF – Common Assembly Format for sequence assembly
 CRAM – compressed file format for storing biological sequences aligned to a reference sequence
 DDBJ – The flatfile format used by the DDBJ to represent database records for nucleotide and peptide sequences from DDBJ databases.
 EMBL – The flatfile format used by the EMBL to represent database records for nucleotide and peptide sequences from EMBL databases.
 FASTA – The FASTA format, for sequence data. Sometimes also given as FNA or FAA (Fasta Nucleic Acid or Fasta Amino Acid).
 FASTQ – The FASTQ format, for sequence data with quality. Sometimes also given as QUAL.
 GCPROJ – The Genome Compiler project. Advanced format for genetic data to be designed, shared and visualized.
 GenBank – The flatfile format used by the NCBI to represent database records for nucleotide and peptide sequences from the GenBank and RefSeq databases
 GFF – The General feature format is used to describe genes and other features of DNA, RNA, and protein sequences
 GTF – The Gene transfer format is used to hold information about gene structure
 MAF – The Multiple Alignment Format stores multiple alignments for whole-genome to whole-genome comparisons 
 NCBI – Structured ASN.1 format used at National Center for Biotechnology Information for DNA and protein data
 NEXUS – The Nexus file encodes mixed information about genetic sequence data in a block structured format
 NeXML – XML format for phylogenetic trees
 NWK – The Newick tree format is a way of representing graph-theoretical trees with edge lengths using parentheses and commas and useful to hold phylogenetic trees.
 PDB – structures of biomolecules deposited in Protein Data Bank, also used to exchange protein and nucleic acid structures
 PHD – Phred output, from the base-calling software Phred
 PLN – Protein Line Notation used in proteax software specification
 SAM – SAM, Sequence Alignment Map format, in which the results of the 1000 Genomes Project will be released
 SBML – The Systems Biology Markup Language is used to store biochemical network computational models
 SCF – Staden chromatogram files used to store data from DNA sequencing
 SFF – Standard Flowgram Format
 SRA – format used by the National Center for Biotechnology Information Short Read Archive to store high-throughput DNA sequence data
 Stockholm – The Stockholm format for representing multiple sequence alignments
 Swiss-Prot – The flatfile format used to represent database records for protein sequences from the Swiss-Prot database
 VCF – Variant Call Format, a standard created by the 1000 Genomes Project that lists and annotates the entire collection of human variants (with the exception of approximately 1.6 million variants).

Biomedical imaging 
 .dcm – Digital Imaging and Communications in Medicine (DICOM) 
 NIfTI – Neuroimaging Informatics Technology Initiative
 .nii – single-file (combined data and meta-data) style
 .nii.gz – gzip-compressed, used transparently by some software, notably the FMRIB Software Library (FSL)
 .gii – single-file (combined data and meta-data) style; NIfTI offspring for brain surface data
 .img, .hdr – dual-file (separate data and meta-data, respectively) style
 .BRIK, .HEAD – AFNI data, meta-data
 .MGH – uncompressed, Massachusetts General Hospital imaging format, used by the FreeSurfer brain analysis package
 .MGZ – zip-compressed, Massachusetts General Hospital imaging format, used by the FreeSurfer brain analysis package
 .img, .hdr – Analyze data, meta-data
 MINC – Medical Imaging NetCDF format
 .mnc – previously based on NetCDF; since version 2.0, based on HDF5

Biomedical signals (time series) 
 ACQ – AcqKnowledge format for Windows/PC from Biopac Systems Inc., Goleta, CA, USA
 ADICHT – LabChart format from ADInstruments Pty Ltd, Bella Vista NSW, Australia
 BCI2000 – The BCI2000 project, Albany, NY, USA
 BDF – BioSemi data format from BioSemi B.V. Amsterdam, Netherlands
 BKR – The EEG data format developed at the University of Technology Graz, Austria
 CFWB – Chart Data Format from ADInstruments Pty Ltd, Bella Vista NSW, Australia
 DICOM – Waveform An extension of Dicom for storing waveform data
 ecgML – A markup language for electrocardiogram data acquisition and analysis
 EDF, EDF+ – European Data Format
 FEF – File Exchange Format for Vital signs, CEN TS 14271
 GDF – The General Data Format for biomedical signals
 HL7aECG – Health Level 7 v3 annotated ECG
 MFER – Medical waveform Format Encoding Rules
 OpenXDF – Open Exchange Data Format from Neurotronics, Inc., Gainesville, FL, USA
 SCP-ECG – Standard Communication Protocol for Computer assisted electrocardiography EN1064:2007
 SIGIF – A digital SIGnal Interchange Format with application in neurophysiology
 WFDB – Format of Physiobank
 XDF – eXtensible Data Format

Other biomedical formats 
  HL7 – Health Level 7, a framework for exchange, integration, sharing, and retrieval of health information electronically
 xDT – a family of data exchange formats for medical records

Biometric formats 
 CBF – Common Biometric Format, based on CBEFF 2.0 (Common Biometric ExFramework).
 EBF – Extended Biometric Format, based on CBF but with S/MIME encryption support and semantic extensions 
 CBFX – XML Common Biometric Format, based upon XCBF 1.1 (OASIS XML Common Biometric Format) 
 EBFX – XML Extended Biometric Format, based on CBFX but with W3C XML Encryption support and semantic extensions

ADB – Ada body
 ADS – Ada specification
 AHK – AutoHotkey script file
 APPLESCRIPT – applescript: see SCPT
 AS – Adobe Flash ActionScript File
 AU3 – AutoIt version 3
 AWK - AWK
 BAT – Batch file
 BAS – QBasic & QuickBASIC
 BTM — Batch file
 CLASS — Compiled Java binary
 CLJS – ClojureScript
 CMD – Batch file
 Coffee – CoffeeScript
 C – C 
 CIA - Nintendo 3DS Software Installation File
 CPP – C++
 CS – C#
 INO – Arduino sketch (program)
 EGG – Chicken
 EGT – EGT Asterisk Application Source File, EGT Universal Document
 ERB – Embedded Ruby, Ruby on Rails Script File
 GO – Go
 HTA – HTML Application
 IBI – Icarus script
 ICI – ICI
 IJS – J script
 .ipynb – IPython Notebook
 ITCL – Itcl
 JS – JavaScript and JScript
 JSFL – Adobe JavaScript language
 .kt – Kotlin
 LUA – Lua
 M – Mathematica package file
 MRC – mIRC Script
 NCF – NetWare Command File (scripting for Novell's NetWare OS)
 NUC – compiled script
 NUD – C++ External module written in C++
 NUT – Squirrel
 nqp – Raku language Not Quite Perl, or Raku bootstrapping language
 O — Compiled and optimized C/C++ binary
 pde – Processing (programming language), Processing script
 PHP – PHP
 PHP? – PHP (? = version number)
 PL – Perl
 PM – Perl module
 PS1 – Windows PowerShell shell script
 PS1XML – Windows PowerShell format and type definitions
 PSC1 – Windows PowerShell console file
 PSD1 – Windows PowerShell data file
 PSM1 – Windows PowerShell module file
 PY – Python
 PYC – Python byte code files
 PYO – Python
 R – R scripts
 r – REBOL scripts
 raku – Raku language Raku script (compiled into memory)
 rakumod – Raku language Raku module (precompiled)
 rakudoc – Raku language Raku documentation file (a slang or sublanguage of Raku)
 rakutest – Raku language Unit test files in Raku
 RB – Ruby
 RDP – RDP connection
 red – Red scripts
 RS – Rust (programming language)
 SB2, SB3 – Scratch
 SCPT – Applescript
 SCPTD – See SCPT.
 SDL – State Description Language
 SH – Shell script
 SYJS – SyMAT JavaScript
 SYPY – SyMAT Python
 TCL – Tcl
 TNS – Ti-Nspire Code/File
 TS – TypeScript
 VBS – Visual Basic Script
 XPL – XProc script/pipeline
 ebuild – Gentoo Linux's portage package.

Security 
Authentication and general encryption formats are listed here.

 OMF – OpenPGP Message Format used by Pretty Good Privacy, GNU Privacy Guard, and other OpenPGP software; can contain keys, signed data, or encrypted data; can be binary or text ("ASCII armored")

Certificates and keys 
 GXK – Galaxkey, an encryption platform for authorized, private and confidential email communication
 .ssh – OpenSSH private key, Secure Shell private key; format generated by ssh-keygen or converted from PPK with PuTTYgen
 .pub – OpenSSH public key, Secure Shell public key; format generated by ssh-keygen or PuTTYgen
 .ppk – PuTTY private key, Secure Shell private key, in the format generated by PuTTYgen instead of the format used by OpenSSH
 .nSign – nSign public key nSign public key in a custom format

X.509 
 .cer, .crt, .der – Distinguished Encoding Rules stores certificates
 .p7b, .p7c – PKCS#7 SignedData commonly appears without main data, just certificates or certificate revocation lists (CRLs)
 .p12, .pfx – PKCS#12 can store public certificates and private keys
 PEM – Privacy-enhanced Electronic Mail: full format not widely used, but often used to store Distinguished Encoding Rules in Base64 format
 PFX – Microsoft predecessor of PKCS#12

Encrypted files 

This section shows file formats for encrypted general data, rather than a specific program's data.

 AXX – Encrypted file, created with AxCrypt
 EEA – An encrypted CAB, ostensibly for protecting email attachments
 TC – Virtual encrypted disk container, created by TrueCrypt
 KODE – Encrypted file, created with KodeFile
 nSignE – An encrypted private key, created by nSign

Password files 

Password files (sometimes called keychain files) contain lists of other passwords, usually encrypted.

 BPW – Encrypted password file created by Bitser password manager
 KDB – KeePass 1 database
 KDBX – KeePass 2 database

Signal data (non-audio) 

 ACQ – AcqKnowledge format for Windows/PC from Biopac
 ADICHT – LabChart format from ADInstruments
 BKR – The EEG data format developed at the University of Technology Graz
 BDF, CFG – Configuration file for Comtrade data
 CFWB – Chart Data format from ADInstruments
 DAT – Raw data file for Comtrade data
 EDF – European data format
 FEF – File Exchange Format for Vital signs
 GDF – General data formats for biomedical signals
 GMS – Gesture And Motion Signal format
 IROCK – intelliRock Sensor Data File Format
 MFER – Medical waveform Format Encoding Rules
 SAC – Seismic Analysis Code, earthquake seismology data format
 SCP-ECG – Standard Communication Protocol for Computer assisted electrocardiography
 SEED, MSEED – Standard for the Exchange of Earthquake Data, seismological data and sensor metadata
 SEGY – Reflection seismology data format
 SIGIF – SIGnal Interchange Format
 WIN, WIN32 – NIED/ERI seismic data format (.cnt)

Sound and music

Lossless audio

Uncompressed 

 8SVX – Commodore-Amiga 8-bit sound (usually in an IFF container)
 16SVX – Commodore-Amiga 16-bit sound (usually in an IFF container)
 AIFF, AIF, AIFC – Audio Interchange File Format
 AU – Simple audio file format introduced by Sun Microsystems
 AUP3 - Audacity’s file for when you save a song
 BWF – Broadcast Wave Format, an extension of WAVE
 CDDA – Compact Disc Digital Audio
 DSF, DFF – Direct Stream Digital audio file, also used in Super Audio CD
 RAW – Raw samples without any header or sync
 WAV – Microsoft Wave
 CWAV - file read by the Nintendo 3DS for Home-screen sound effects

Compressed 

 RA, RM – RealAudio format
 FLAC – Free lossless codec of the Ogg project
 LA – Lossless audio
 PAC – LPAC
 APE – Monkey's Audio
 OFR, OFS, OFF – OptimFROG
 RKA – RKAU
 SHN – Shorten
 TAK – Tom's Lossless Audio Kompressor
 THD – Dolby TrueHD
 TTA – Free lossless audio codec (True Audio)
 WV – WavPack
 WMA – Windows Media Audio 9 Lossless
 BCWAV - Nintendo 3DS Home-screen BGM file
 BRSTM – Binary Revolution Stream
 DTS, DTSHD, DTSMA – DTS (sound system)
 AST – Nintendo Audio Stream
 AW – Nintendo Audio Sample used in first-party games
 PSF – Portable Sound Format, PlayStation variant (originally PlayStation Sound Format)

Lossy audio 

 AC3 – Usually used for Dolby Digital tracks
 AMR – For GSM and UMTS based mobile phones
 MP1 – MPEG Layer 1
 MP2 – MPEG Layer 2
 MP3 – MPEG Layer 3
 SPX – Speex (Ogg project, specialized for voice, low bitrates)
 GSM – GSM Full Rate, originally developed for use in mobile phones
 WMA – Windows Media Audio
 AAC – Advanced Audio Coding (usually in an MPEG-4 container)
 MPC – Musepack
 VQF – Yamaha TwinVQ
 OTS – Audio File (similar to MP3, with more data stored in the file and slightly better compression; designed for use with OtsLabs' OtsAV)
 SWA – Adobe Shockwave Audio (Same compression as MP3 with additional header information specific to Adobe Director)
 VOX – Dialogic ADPCM Low Sample Rate Digitized Voice
 VOC – Creative Labs Soundblaster Creative Voice 8-bit & 16-bit Also output format of RCA Audio Recorders
 DWD – DiamondWare Digitized
 SMP – Turtlebeach SampleVision
 OGG – Ogg Vorbis

Tracker modules and related 

 MOD – Soundtracker and Protracker sample and melody modules
 MT2 – MadTracker 2 module
 S3M – Scream Tracker 3 module
 XM – Fast Tracker module
 IT – Impulse Tracker module
 NSF – NES Sound Format
 MID, MIDI – Standard MIDI file; most often just notes and controls but occasionally also sample dumps (.mid, .rmi)
 FTM – FamiTracker Project file
 BTM – BambooTracker Project file

Sheet music files 

 ABC – ABC Notation sheet music file
 DARMS – DARMS File Format also known as the Ford-Columbia Format
 ETF – Enigma Transportation Format abandoned sheet music exchange format
 GP – Guitar Pro sheet music and tablature file
 KERN – Kern File Format sheet music file
 LY – LilyPond sheet music file
 MEI – Music Encoding Initiative file format that attempts to encode all musical notations
 MIDI - MIDI file format that is a music sheet for instruments
 MUS, MUSX – Finale sheet music file
 MXL, XML – MusicXML standard sheet music exchange format
 MSCX, MSCZ – MuseScore sheet music file
 SMDL – Standard Music Description Language sheet music file
 SIB – Sibelius sheet music file

Other file formats pertaining to audio 

 NIFF – Notation Interchange File Format
 PTB – Power Tab Editor tab
 ASF – Advanced Systems Format
 CUST – DeliPlayer custom sound format
 GYM – Genesis YM2612 log
 JAM – Jam music format
 MNG – Background music for the Creatures game series, starting from Creatures 2
 RMJ – RealJukebox Media used for RealPlayer
 SID – Sound Interface Device – Commodore 64 instructions to play SID music and sound effects
 SPC – Super NES sound format
 TXM – Track ax media
 VGM – Stands for "Video Game Music", log for several different chips
 YM – Atari ST/Amstrad CPC YM2149 sound chip format
 PVD – Portable Voice Document used for Oaisys & Mitel call recordings

Playlist formats 

 AIMPPL – AIMP Playlist format
 ASX – Advanced Stream Redirector
 RAM – Real Audio Metafile For RealAudio files only.
 XPL – HDi playlist
 XSPF – XML Shareable Playlist Format
 ZPL – Xbox Music (Formerly Zune) Playlist format from Microsoft
 M3U – Multimedia playlist file
 PLS – Multimedia playlist, originally developed for use with the museArc

Audio editing and music production 

 ALS – Ableton Live set
 ALC – Ableton Live clip
 ALP – Ableton Live pack
 ATMOS, AUDIO, METADATA – Dolby Atmos Rendering and Mastering related file
 AUP – Audacity project file
 AUP3 – Audacity 3.0 project file
 BAND – GarageBand project file
 CEL – Adobe Audition loop file (Cool Edit Loop)
 CAU – Caustic project file
 CPR – Steinberg Cubase project file
 CWP – Cakewalk Sonar project file
 DRM – Steinberg Cubase drum file
 DMKIT – Image-Line's Drumaxx drum kit file
 ENS – Native Instruments Reaktor Ensemble
 FLM – Image Line FL Studio Mobile project file
 FLP – Image Line FL Studio project file
 GRIR – Native Instruments Komplete Guitar Rig Impulse Response
 LOGIC – Logic Pro X project file
 MMP – LMMS project file (alternatively MMPZ for compressed formats)
 MMR – MAGIX Music Maker project file
 MX6HS – Mixcraft 6 Home Studio project file
 NPR – Steinberg Nuendo project file
 OMF, OMFI – Open Media Framework Interchange OMFI succeeds OMF (Open Media Framework)
 PTX – Pro Tools 10 or later project file
 PTF – Pro Tools 7 up to Pro Tools 9 project file
 PTS – Legacy Pro Tools project file
 RIN – Soundways RIN-M file containing sound recording participant credits and song information
 RPP, RPP-BAK – REAPER project file
 REAPEAKS – REAPER peak (waveform cache) file
 SES – Adobe Audition multitrack session file
 SFK – Sound Forge waveform cache file
 SFL – Sound Forge sound file
 SNG – MIDI sequence file (MidiSoft, Korg, etc.) or n-Track Studio project file
 STF – StudioFactory project file. It contains all necessary patches, samples, tracks and settings to play the file
 SND – Akai MPC sound file
 SYN – SynFactory project file. It contains all necessary patches, samples, tracks and settings to play the file
 UST – Utau Editor sequence excluding wave-file
 VCLS – VocaListener project file
 VPR – Vocaloid 5 Editor sequence excluding wave-file
 VSQ – Vocaloid 2 Editor sequence excluding wave-file
 VSQX – Vocaloid 3 & 4 Editor sequence excluding wave-file
 🗿 – ThirtyDollar Project file

Recorded television formats 

 DVR-MS – Windows XP Media Center Edition's Windows Media Center recorded television format
 WTV – Windows Vista's and up Windows Media Center recorded television format

Source code for computer programs 

 ADA, ADB, 2.ADA – Ada (body) source
 ADS, 1.ADA – Ada (specification) source
 ASM, S – Assembly language source
 BAS – BASIC, FreeBASIC, Visual Basic, BASIC-PLUS source, PICAXE basic
 BB – Blitz Basic Blitz3D
 BMX – Blitz Basic BlitzMax
 C – C source
 CLJ – Clojure source code
 CLS – Visual Basic class
 COB, CBL – COBOL source
 CPP, CC, CXX, C, CBP – C++ source
 CS – C# source
 CSPROJ – C# project (Visual Studio .NET)
 D – D source
 DBA – DarkBASIC source
 DBPro123 – DarkBASIC Professional project
 E – Eiffel source
 EFS – EGT Forever Source File
 EGT – EGT Asterisk Source File, could be J, C#, VB.net, EF 2.0 (EGT Forever)
 EL – Emacs Lisp source
 FOR, FTN, F, F77, F90 – Fortran source
 FRM – Visual Basic form
 FRX – Visual Basic form stash file (binary form file)
 FTH – Forth source
 GED – Game Maker Extension Editable file as of version 7.0
 GM6 – Game Maker Editable file as of version 6.x
 GMD – Game Maker Editable file up to version 5.x
 GMK – Game Maker Editable file as of version 7.0
 GML – Game Maker Language script file
 GO – Go source
 H – C/C++ header file
 HPP, HXX – C++ header file
 HS – Haskell source
 I – SWIG interface file
 INC – Turbo Pascal included source
 JAVA – Java source
 L – lex source
 LGT – Logtalk source
 LISP – Common Lisp source
 M – Objective-C source
 M – MATLAB
 M – Mathematica
 M4 – m4 source
 ML – Standard ML and OCaml source
 MSQR – M² source file, created by Mattia Marziali
 N – Nemerle source
 NB – Nuclear Basic source
 P – Parser source
 PAS, PP, P – Pascal source (DPR for projects)
 PHP, PHP3, PHP4, PHP5, PHPS, Phtml – PHP source
 PIV – Pivot stickfigure animator
 PL, PM – Perl
PLI, PL1 – PL/I
 PRG – Ashton-Tate; dbII, dbIII and dbIV, db, db7, clipper, Microsoft Fox and FoxPro, harbour, xharbour, and Xbase
 PRO – IDL
 POL – Apcera Policy Language doclet
 PY – Python source
 R – R source
 raku, rakumod, rakudoc, rakutest, nqp – Raku Language
 RED – Red source
 REDS – Red/System source
 RB – Ruby source
 RESX – Resource file for .NET applications
 RC, RC2 – Resource script files to generate resources for .NET applications
 RKT, RKTL – Racket source
 SCALA – Scala source
 SCI, SCE – Scilab
 SCM – Scheme source
 SD7 – Seed7 source
 SKB, SKC – Sage Retrieve 4GL Common Area (Main and Amended backup)
 SKD – Sage Retrieve 4GL Database
 SKF, SKG – Sage Retrieve 4GL File Layouts (Main and Amended backup)
 SKI – Sage Retrieve 4GL Instructions
 SKK – Sage Retrieve 4GL Report Generator
 SKM – Sage Retrieve 4GL Menu
 SKO – Sage Retrieve 4GL Program
 SKP, SKQ – Sage Retrieve 4GL Print Layouts (Main and Amended backup)
 SKS, SKT – Sage Retrieve 4GL Screen Layouts (Main and Amended backup)
 SKZ – Sage Retrieve 4GL Security File
 SLN – Visual Studio solution
SPIN – Spin source (for Parallax Propeller microcontrollers)
 STK – Stickfigure file for Pivot stickfigure animator
 SWG – SWIG source code
 TCL – Tcl source code
 VAP – Visual Studio Analyzer project
 VB – Visual Basic.NET source
 VBG – Visual Studio compatible project group
 VBP, VIP – Visual Basic project
 VBPROJ – Visual Basic .NET project
 VCPROJ – Visual C++ project
 VDPROJ – Visual Studio deployment project
 XPL – XProc script/pipeline
 XQ – XQuery file
 XSL – XSLT stylesheet
 Y – yacc source

Spreadsheet 
 123 – Lotus 1-2-3
 AB2 – Abykus worksheet
 AB3 – Abykus workbook
 AWS – Ability Spreadsheet
 BCSV – Nintendo proprietary table format
 CLF – ThinkFree Calc
 CELL – Haansoft(Hancom) SpreadSheet software document
 CSV – Comma-Separated Values
 GSHEET – Google Drive Spreadsheet
 numbers – An Apple Numbers Spreadsheet file
 gnumeric – Gnumeric spreadsheet, a gziped XML file
 LCW – Lucid 3-D
 ODS – OpenDocument spreadsheet
 OTS – OpenDocument spreadsheet template
 QPW – Quattro Pro spreadsheet
 SDC – StarOffice StarCalc Spreadsheet
 SLK – SYLK (SYmbolic LinK)
 STC – OpenOffice.org XML (obsolete) Spreadsheet template
 SXC – OpenOffice.org XML (obsolete) Spreadsheet
 TAB – tab delimited columns; also TSV (Tab-Separated Values)
 TXT – text file
 VC – Visicalc
 WK1 – Lotus 1-2-3 up to version 2.01
 WK3 – Lotus 1-2-3 version 3.0
 WK4 – Lotus 1-2-3 version 4.0
 WKS – Lotus 1-2-3
 WKS – Microsoft Works
 WQ1 – Quattro Pro DOS version
 XLK – Microsoft Excel worksheet backup
 XLS – Microsoft Excel worksheet sheet (97–2003)
 XLSB – Microsoft Excel binary workbook
 XLSM – Microsoft Excel Macro-enabled workbook
 XLSX – Office Open XML worksheet sheet
 XLR – Microsoft Works version 6.0
 XLT – Microsoft Excel worksheet template
 XLTM – Microsoft Excel Macro-enabled worksheet template
 XLW – Microsoft Excel worksheet workspace (version 4.0)

Tabulated data 
 TSV – Tab-separated values
 CSV – Comma-separated values
 db – databank format; accessible by many econometric applications
 dif – accessible by many spreadsheet applications

Video 

AAF – mostly intended to hold edit decisions and rendering information, but can also contain compressed media essence
 3GP – the most common video format for cell phones
 GIF – Animated GIF (simple animation; until recently often avoided because of patent problems)
 ASF – container (enables any form of compression to be used; MPEG-4 is common; video in ASF-containers is also called Windows Media Video (WMV))
 AVCHD – Advanced Video Codec High Definition
 AVI – container (a shell, which enables any form of compression to be used)
 .bik – BIK Bink Video file. A video compression system developed by RAD Game Tools
 BRAW – a video format used by Blackmagic's Ursa Mini Pro 12K cameras.
 CAM – aMSN webcam log file
 COLLAB – Blackboard Collaborate session recording 
 DAT – video standard data file (automatically created when we attempted to burn as video file on the CD)
 DVR-MS – Windows XP Media Center Edition's Windows Media Center recorded television format
 FLV – Flash video (encoded to run in a flash animation)
 MPEG-1 – M1V Video
 MPEG-2 – M2V Video
 NOA – rare movie format use in some Japanese eroges around 2002
 FLA – Adobe Flash (for producing)
 FLR – (text file which contains scripts extracted from SWF by a free ActionScript decompiler named FLARE)
 SOL – Adobe Flash shared object ("Flash cookie")
 STR – Sony PlayStation video stream
 M4V – video container file format developed by Apple
 .mkv – Matroska Matroska is a container format, which enables any video format such as MPEG-4 ASP or AVC to be used along with other content such as subtitles and detailed meta information
 WRAP – MediaForge (*.wrap)
 MNG – mainly simple animation containing PNG and JPEG objects, often somewhat more complex than animated GIF
 .mov – QuickTime container which enables any form of compression to be used; Sorenson codec is the most common; QTCH is the filetype for cached video and audio streams
 .mpeg, .mpg, .mpe - MPEG
 THP – Nintendo proprietary movie/video format
 MPEG-4  – MPEG-4 Part 14, shortened "MP4" multimedia container (most often used for Sony's PlayStation Portable and Apple's iPod)
 MXF – Material Exchange Format (standardized wrapper format for audio/visual material developed by SMPTE)
 ROQ – used by Quake III Arena
 NSV – NSV Nullsoft Streaming Video (media container designed for streaming video content over the Internet)
 Ogg – container, multimedia
 RM – RealMedia
 SVI – SVI Samsung video format for portable players
 SMI – SMI SAMI Caption file (HTML like subtitle for movie files)
 .smk – SMK Smacker video file. A video compression system developed by RAD Game Tools
 SWF – Adobe Flash (for viewing)
 WMV – Windows Media Video (See ASF)
 WTV – Windows Vista's and up Windows Media Center recorded television format
 YUV – raw video format; resolution (horizontal x vertical) and sample structure 4:2:2 or 4:2:0 must be known explicitly
 WebM – video file format for web video using HTML5

Video editing, production 
 BRAW – Blackmagic Design RAW video file name
 DRP – Davinci Resolve 17 project file
 FCP – Final Cut Pro project file
 MSWMM – Windows Movie Maker project file
 PPJ, PRPROJ – Adobe Premiere Pro video editing file
 IMOVIEPROJ – iMovie project file
 VEG, VEG-BAK – Sony Vegas project file
 SUF – Sony camera configuration file (setup.suf) produced by XDCAM-EX camcorders
 WLMP – Windows Live Movie Maker project file
 KDENLIVE – Kdenlive project file
 VPJ – VideoPad project file
 MOTN – Apple Motion project file
 IMOVIEMOBILE – iMovie project file for iOS users
 WFP, WVE — Wondershare Filmora Project
 PDS – Cyberlink PowerDirector project
 VPROJ – VSDC Free Video Editor project file

Video game data 
List of common file formats of data for video games on systems that support filesystems, most commonly PC games.
Minecraft — files used by Mojang to develop Minecraft
 MCADDON – format used by the Bedrock Edition of Minecraft for add-ons; Resource packs for the game
 MCFUNCTION – format used by Minecraft for storing functions
 MCMETA – format used by Minecraft for storing data for customizable texture packs for the game
 MCPACK – format used by the Bedrock Edition of Minecraft for in-game texture packs; full addons for the game
 MCR – format used by Minecraft for storing data for in-game worlds before version 1.2
 MCTEMPLATE – format used by the Bedrock Edition of Minecraft for world templates
 MCWORLD – format used by the Bedrock Edition of Minecraft for in-game worlds
 NBS – format used by Note Block Studio, a tool that can be used to make note block songs for Minecraft.
 TrackMania/Maniaplanet Engine – Formats used by games based on the TrackMania engine.
 GBX – All user-created content is stored in this file type.
 REPLAY.GBX – Stores the replay of a race.
 CHALLENGE.GBX, MAP.GBX – Stores tracks/maps.
 SYSTEMCONFIG.GBX – Launcher info.
 TRACKMANIAVEHICLE.GBX – Info about a certain car type.
 VEHICLETUNINGS.GBX – Vehicle physics.
 SOLID.GBX – A block's model.
 ITEM.GBX – Custom Maniaplanet item.
 BLOCK.GBX – Custom Maniaplanet block.
 TEXTURE.GBX – Info about a texture that are used in materials.
 MATERIAL.GBX – Info about a material such as surface type that are used in Solids.
 TMEDCLASSIC.GBX – Block info.
 GHOST.GBX – Player ghosts in Trackmania and TrackMania Turbo.
 CONTROLSTYLE.GBX – Menu files.
 SCORES.GBX – Stores info about the player's best times.
 PROFILE.GBX – Stores a player's info such as their login.
 DDS – Almost every texture in the game uses this format.
 PAK – Stores environment data such as valid blocks.
 LOC – A locator. Locators allow the game to download content such as car skins from an external server.
 SCRIPT.TXT – Scripts for Maniaplanet such as menus and game modes.
 XML – ManiaLinks.
 Doom engine – Formats used by games based on the Doom engine.
 DEH – DeHackEd files to mutate the game executable (not officially part of the DOOM engine)
 DSG – Saved game
 LMP – A lump is an entry in a DOOM wad.
 LMP – Saved demo recording
 MUS – Music file (usually contained within a WAD file)
 WAD – Data storage (contains music, maps, and textures)
 Quake engine – Formats used by games based on the Quake engine.
 BSP – BSP: (For Binary space partitioning) compiled map format
 MAP – MAP: Raw map format used by editors like GtkRadiant or QuArK
 MDL, MD2, MD3, MD5 – MDL/MD2/MD3/MD5: Model for an item used in the game
 PAK, PK2 – PAK/PK2: Data storage
 PK3, PK4 – PK3/PK4: used by the Quake II, Quake III Arena and Quake 4 game engines, respectively, to store game data, textures etc. They are actually .zip files.
 .dat – not specific file type, often generic extension for "data" files for a variety of applications
 sometimes used for general data contained within the .PK3/PK4 files
 .fontdat – a .dat file used for formatting game fonts
 .roq – Video format
 .sav – Savegame format
 Unreal Engine – Formats used by games based on the Unreal engine.
 U – Unreal script format
 UAX – Animations format for Unreal Engine 2
 UMX – Map format for Unreal Tournament
 UMX – Music format for Unreal Engine 1
 UNR – Map format for Unreal
 UPK – Package format for cooked content in Unreal Engine 3
 USX – Sound format for Unreal Engine 1 and Unreal Engine 2
 UT2 – Map format for Unreal Tournament 2003 and Unreal Tournament 2004
 UT3 – Map format for Unreal Tournament 3
 UTX – Texture format for Unreal Engine 1 and Unreal Engine 2
 UXX – Cache format; these are files a client downloaded from server (which can be converted to regular formats)
 Duke Nukem 3D Engine – Formats used by games based on this engine
 DMO – Save game
 GRP – Data storage
 MAP – Map (usually constructed with BUILD.EXE)
 Diablo Engine – Formats used by Diablo by Blizzard Entertainment.
 SV – Save Game
 ITM – Item File
 Real Virtuality Engine – Formats used by Bohemia Interactive. Operation:Flashpoint, ARMA 2, VBS2
 SQF – Format used for general editing
 SQM – Format used for mission files
 PBO – Binarized file used for compiled models
 LIP – Format that is created from WAV files to create in-game accurate lip-synch for character animations.
 Source Engine – Formats used by Valve. Half-Life 2, Counter-Strike: Source, Day of Defeat: Source, Half-Life 2: Episode One, Team Fortress 2, Half-Life 2: Episode Two, Portal, Left 4 Dead, Left 4 Dead 2, Alien Swarm, Portal 2, Counter-Strike: Global Offensive, Titanfall, Insurgency, Titanfall 2, Day of Infamy
 VMF – Valve Hammer Map editor raw map file
 VMX – Valve Hammer Map editor backup map file
 BSP – Source Engine compiled map file
 MDL – Source Engine model format
 SMD – Source Engine uncompiled model format
 PCF – Source Engine particle effect file
 HL2 – Half-Life 2 save format
 DEM – Source Engine demo format
 VPK – Source Engine pack format
 VTF – Source Engine texture format
 VMT – Source Engine material format.
 Pokemon Generation V
 CGB – Pokemon Black and White/Pokemon Black 2 and White 2 C-Gear skins.
 Other Formats
 ARC – used to store New Super Mario Bros. Wii level data
 B – used for Grand Theft Auto saved game files
 BOL – used for levels on Poing!PC
 DBPF – The Sims 2, DBPF, Package
 DIVA – Project DIVA timings, element coördinates, MP3 references, notes, animation poses and scores.
 ESM, ESP – Master and Plugin data archives for the Creation Engine
 HAMBU – format used by the Aidan's Funhouse game RGTW for storing map data
 HE0, HE2, HE4 – HE games File
 GCF – format used by the Steam content management system for file archives
 IMG – format used by Renderware-based Grand Theft Auto games for data storage
 LOVE – format used by the LOVE2D Engine
 MAP – format used by Halo: Combat Evolved for archive compression, Doom³, and various other games
 MCA – format used by Minecraft for storing data for in-game worlds
 NBT – format used by Minecraft for storing program variables along with their (Java) type identifiers
 OEC – format used by OE-Cake for scene data storage
 OSB – osu! storyboard data
 OSC – osu!stream combined stream data
 OSF2 – free osu!stream song file
 OSR – osu! replay data
 OSU – osu! beatmap data
 OSZ2 – paid osu!stream song file
 P3D – format for panda3d by Disney
 PLAGUEINC – format used by Plague Inc. for storing custom scenario information
 POD – format used by Terminal Reality
 RCT – Used for templates and save files in RollerCoaster Tycoon games
 REP – used by Blizzard Entertainment for scenario replays in StarCraft.
 Simcity, DBPF, .dat, .SC4Lot, .SC4Model –  All game plugins use this format, commonly with different file extensions(Simcity 4)
 SMZIP – ZIP-based package for StepMania songs, themes and announcer packs.
 SOLITAIRETHEME8 – A solitaire theme for Windows solitaire
 USLD – format used by Unison Shift to store level layouts.
 VVVVVV – format used by VVVVVV
 CPS – format used by The Powder Toy, Powder Toy save
 STM – format used by The Powder Toy, Powder Toy stamp
 PKG – format used by Bungie for the PC Beta of Destiny 2, for nearly all the game's assets.
 CHR – format used by Team Salvato, for the character files of Doki Doki Literature Club!
 Z5 – format used by Z-machine for story files in interactive fiction.
 scworld – format used by Survivalcraft to store sandbox worlds.
 scskin – format used by Survivalcraft to store player skins.
 scbtex – format used by Survivalcraft to store block textures.
 prison – format used by Prison Architect to save prisons
 escape – format used by Prison Architect to save escape attempts
 WBFS  - (Wii Backup File System) 
 .GBA - Game Boy Advance ROM File
 .pss - Sony PlayStation 2 Game Video file and is used to store audio and video data by games for the Playstation 2 console.

Video game storage media 
List of the most common filename extensions used when a game's ROM image or storage medium is copied from an original read-only memory (ROM) device to an external memory such as hard disk for back up purposes or for making the game playable with an emulator. In the case of cartridge-based software, if the platform specific extension is not used then filename extensions ".rom" or ".bin" are usually used to clarify that the file contains a copy of a content of a ROM. ROM, disk or tape images usually do not consist of one file or ROM, rather an entire file or ROM structure contained within one file on the backup medium.
 .a26 – Atari 2600
 .a52 – Atari 5200 
 .a78 – Atari 7800
 .lnx – Atari Lynx 
 .jag, .j64 – Atari Jaguar 
 .iso, .wbfs, .wad, .wdf – Wii and WiiU 
 .gcm, .iso – GameCube 
 .min – Pokemon mini 
 .nds – Nintendo DS 
 .dsi – Nintendo DSiWare
 .3ds – Nintendo 3DS 
 .cia – Nintendo 3DS Installation File (for installing games with the use of the FBI homebrew application)
 .gb – Game Boy  (this applies to the original Game Boy and the Game Boy Color)
 .gbc – Game Boy Color 
 .gba – Game Boy Advance 
 .sav – Game Boy Advance Saved Data Files 
 .sgm – Visual Boy Advance Save States 
 .n64, .v64, .z64, .u64, .usa, .jap, .pal, .eur, .bin – Nintendo 64 
 .pj – Project 64 Save States 
 .nes – Nintendo Entertainment System 
 .fds – Famicom Disk System 
 .jst – Jnes Save States 
 .fc# – FCEUX Save States (.fc#, where # is any character, usually a number)
 .gg – Game Gear 
 .sms – Master System 
 .sg – SG-1000 
 .smd, .bin – Mega Drive/Genesis 
 .32x – Sega 32X 
 .smc, .078, .sfc – Super NES  (.078 is for split ROMs, which are rare)
 .fig – Super Famicom (Japanese releases are rarely .fig, above extensions are more common)
 .srm – Super NES Saved Data Files
 .zst, .zs1-.zs9, .z10-.z99 – ZSNES Save States (.zst, .zs1-.zs9, .z10-.z99)
 .frz, .000-.008 – Snes9X Save States 
 .pce – TurboGrafx-16/PC Engine 
 .npc, .ngp – Neo Geo Pocket 
 .ngc – Neo Geo Pocket Color 
 .vb  – Virtual Boy 
 .int – Intellivision 
 .min – Pokémon Mini 
 .vec – Vectrex 
 .bin – Odyssey² 
 .ws – WonderSwan 
 .wsc – WonderSwan Color 
 .tzx – ZX Spectrum  (for exact copies of ZX Spectrum games)
 TAP – for tape images without copy protection
 Z80, SNA – (for snapshots of the emulator RAM)
 DSK – (for disk images)
 .tap – Commodore 64 (.tap) (for tape images including copy protection)
 T64 – (for tape images without copy protection, considerably smaller than .tap files)
 D64 – (for disk images)
 CRT – (for cartridge images)
 .adf – Amiga (.adf) (for 880K diskette images)
 ADZ – GZip-compressed version of the above.
 DMS – Disk Masher System, previously used as a disk-archiving system native to the Amiga, also supported by emulators.
 .pss - A Sony PlayStation 2 Game Video file and is used to store audio and video data by games for the Playstation 2 console.

Virtual machines

Microsoft Virtual PC, Virtual Server 
 .vfd – Virtual Floppy Disk 
 .vhd – Virtual Hard Disk 
 .vud – Virtual Undo Disk 
 .vmc – Virtual Machine Configuration 
 .vsv – Virtual Machine Saved State

VMware ESX, GSX, Workstation, Player 
 .log – Virtual Machine Logfile 
 .vmdk, .dsk – Virtual Machine Disk 
 .nvram – Virtual Machine BIOS 
 .vmem – Virtual Machine paging file 
 .vmsd – Virtual Machine snapshot metadata 
 .vmsn – Virtual Machine snapshot 
 .vmss, .std – Virtual Machine suspended state
 .vmtm – Virtual Machine team data
 .vmx, .cfg – Virtual Machine configuration
 .vmxf – Virtual Machine team configuration

VirtualBox 
 .vdi – VirtualBox virtual disk image
 .vbox-extpack – VirtualBox extension pack

Parallels Workstation 
 .hdd – Virtual Machine hard disk
 .pvs – Virtual Machine preferences/configuration
 .sav – Virtual Machine saved state

QEMU 
 .cow – Copy-on-write
 .qcow – QEMU copy-on-write
 .qcow2 – QEMU copy-on-write – version 2
 .qed – QEMU enhanced disk format

Web page 
Static
 DTD – Document Type Definition (standard), MUST be public and free
 .html, .htm – HTML HyperText Markup Language
 .xhtml, .xht – XHTML eXtensible HyperText Markup Language
 .mht, .mhtml – MHTML Archived HTML, store all data on one web page (text, images, etc.) in one big file
 .maff – MAF web archive based on ZIP
Dynamically generated
 .asp – ASP Microsoft Active Server Page
 .aspx – ASPX Microsoft Active Server Page. NET
 .adp – ADP AOLserver Dynamic Page
 .bml – BML Better Markup Language (templating)
 .cfm – CFM ColdFusion
 .cgi – CGI
 .ihtml – iHTML Inline HTML
 .jsp – JSP JavaServer Pages
 .las, .lasso, .lassoapp – Lasso, A file created or served with the Lasso Programming Language
 .pl – Perl
 .php, .php?, .phtml – PHP ? is version number (previously abbreviated Personal Home Page, later changed to PHP: Hypertext Preprocessor)
 .shtml – SSI HTML with Server Side Includes (Apache)
 .stm – SSI HTML with Server Side Includes (Apache)

Markup languages and other web standards-based formats 
 .atom, .xml – Atom Another syndication format.
 .eml – EML Format used by several desktop email clients.
 .jsonld – JSON-LD A JSON-based serialization for linked data.
 .kprx – KPRX A XML-based serialization for workflow definition generated by K2.
 .ps – PS A XML-based serialization for test automation scripts called PowerScripts for K2 based applications.
 .metalink, .met – Metalink A format to list metadata about downloads, such as mirrors, checksums, and other information.
 .rss, .xml – RSS Syndication format.
 .markdown, .md – Markdown Plain text formatting syntax, which is popularly used to format "readme" files.
 .se – Shuttle Another lightweight markup language.

Other 
 AXD – cookie extensions found in temporary internet folder
 APK - Android Package Kit
 BDF – Binary Data Format – raw data from recovered blocks of unallocated space on a hard drive
 CBP – CD Box Labeler Pro, CentraBuilder, Code::Blocks Project File, Conlab Project
 CEX – SolidWorks Enterprise PDM Vault File
 COL – Nintendo GameCube proprietary collision file (.col)
 CREDX – CredX Dat File
 DDB – Generating code for Vocaloid singers voice (see .DDI)
 DDI – Vocaloid phoneme library (Japanese, English, Korean, Spanish, Chinese, Catalan)
 DUPX – DuupeCheck database management tool project file
 FTM – Family Tree Maker data file
 FTMB – Family Tree Maker backup file
 GA3 – Graphical Analysis 3
 .ged – GEDCOM  (GEnealogical Data COMmunication) format to exchange genealogy data between different genealogy software
 HLP – Windows help file
 IGC – flight tracks downloaded from GPS devices in the FAI's prescribed format
 INF – similar format to INI file; used to install device drivers under Windows, inter alia.
 JAM – JAM Message Base Format for BBSes
 KMC – tests made with KatzReview's MegaCrammer
 KCL – Nintendo GameCube/Wii proprietary collision file (.kcl)
 KTR – Hitachi Vantara Pentaho Data Integration/Kettle Transformation Project file
 LNK – Microsoft Windows format for Hyperlinks to Executables 
 LSM – LSMaker script file (program using layered .jpg to create special effects; specifically designed to render lightsabers from the Star Wars universe) (.lsm)
 NARC – Archive format used in Nintendo DS games.
 OER – AU OER Tool, Open Educational Resource editor
 PA – Used to assign sound effects to materials in KCL files (.pa)
 PIF – Used to run MS-DOS programs under Windows
 POR – So called "portable" SPSS files, readable by PSPP
 PXZ – Compressed file to exchange media elements with PSALMO
 RISE – File containing RISE generated information model evolution
 SCR – Windows Screen Saver file
 TOPC – TopicCrunch SEO Project file holding keywords, domain, and search engine settings (ASCII)
 XLF – Utah State University Extensible LADAR Format
 XMC – Assisted contact lists format, based on XML and used in kindergartens and schools
 ZED – My Heritage Family Tree
 zone – Zone file a text file containing a DNS zone
 FX – Microsoft DirectX plain text effects and properties for the associated file and are used to specify the textures, shading, rendering, lighting and other 3D effects (.fx)
 MIFRAMES – Mine-imator keyframes file (.miframes)
 MILANGUAGE – Mine-Imator language data file (.milanguage)
 MIDATA – Mine-Imator data file (.midata)
 BCA – Short for Burst Cutting Area Holds the information of the circular area near the center of a DVD, HD DVD or Blu-ray Disc, it is usually 64 bytes in size. (.bca)

Cursors 
 ANI – Animated cursor
 CUR – Cursor file
 Smes – Hawk's Dock configuration file

Generalized files

General data formats
These file formats are fairly well defined by long-term use or a general standard, but the content of each file is often highly specific to particular software or has been extended by further standards for specific uses.

Text-based
 CSV – comma-separated values
 HTML – hyper text markup language
 CSS – cascading style sheets
 INI – a configuration text file whose format is substantially similar between applications
 JSON – JavaScript Object Notation is an openly used data format now used by many languages, not just JavaScript
 TSV – tab-separated values
 XML – an open data format
 YAML – an open data format
 ReStructuredText – an open text format for technical documents used mainly in the Python programming language
 .md – Markdown an open lightweight markup language to create simple but rich text, often used to format README files
 AsciiDoc – an open human-readable markup document format semantically equivalent to DocBook
 .yni - a configuration file similar to YAML

Generic file extensions
These are filename extensions and broad types reused frequently with differing formats or no specific format by different programs.

Binary files
 .bak, .bk – Bak file various backup formats: some just copies of data files, some in application-specific data backup formats, some formats for general file backup programs
 BIN – binary data, often memory dumps of executable code or data to be re-used by the same software that originated it
 DAT – data file, usually binary data proprietary to the program that created it, or an MPEG-1 stream of Video CD
 DSK – file representations of various disk storage images
 RAW – raw (unprocessed) data
 SZH - files that are associated with zero unique file types (the most prevalent being the Binary Data format)

Text files
 .cnf, .conf, .cfg – configuration file substantially software-specific
 .log – logfiles usually text, but sometimes binary
 .asc, .txt – human-readable plain text, usually no more specific

Partial files

Differences and patches
 diff – text file differences created by the program diff and applied as updates by patch

Incomplete transfers
 .!ut – !UT partly complete uTorrent download
 .crdownload – CRDOWNLOAD partly complete Google Chrome download
 .opdownload – OPDOWNLOAD partly complete Opera download
 .part – PART partly complete Mozilla Firefox or Transmission download
 .partial – PARTIAL partly complete Internet Explorer or Microsoft Edge download

Temporary files
 .temp, .tmp – Temporary file sometimes in a specific format, but often just raw data in the middle of processing
 Pseudo-pipelines, Pseudo-pipeline  – Pseudo-pipeline file used to simulate a software pipe

See also 
 List of filename extensions
 MIME#Content-Type, a standard for referring to file formats
 List of motion and gesture file formats
 List of file signatures, or "magic numbers"

References

External links
 
 File formats at FileInfo.com